The Rotterdam Tour, in its first two editions called the Tour Beneden-Maas, was an elite women's professional one-day road bicycle race held between 1998 and 2006 in Rotterdam, Netherlands as part of the UCI Women's Road Cycling World Cup. For commercial reasons the race was also known as Lowland International Rotterdam Tour.

Past winners

References

External links

Recurring sporting events established in 1998
1998 establishments in the Netherlands
UCI Women's Road World Cup
Cycle races in the Netherlands
Recurring sporting events disestablished in 2006
Defunct cycling races in the Netherlands
Women's road bicycle races
2006 disestablishments in the Netherlands